Ready or Not may refer to:

Film and television
 Ready or Not (2009 film), an American comedy film
 Ready or Not (2019 film), an American comedy horror film 
 Ready or Not (British TV series), a 2018 comedy game show
 Ready or Not (Canadian TV series), a 1993–1997 teen drama series

Music

Albums
 Ready or Not (Grateful Dead album), 2019
 Ready or Not (Keith Frank album) or the title song, 2000
 Ready or Not (Lou Gramm album) or the title song (see below), 1987
 Ready or Not (Miriam Yeung album) or the title song, 2011
 Ready or Not (Young JV album) or the title song, 2009
 Ready or Not, an EP by Pop Evil, 2006

Songs
 "Ready or Not" (After 7 song), 1990
 "Ready or Not" (Bridgit Mendler song), 2012
 "Ready or Not" (Fugees song), 1996; interpolating a song by the Delfonics (see See also section below)
 "Ready or Not" (Lou Gramm song), 1987
 "Ready or Not" (Momoland song), 2020
 "Ready or Not" (R.I.O. song), 2013
 "Ready or Not"/"Everytime", by A1, 1999
 "Ready or Not", by Britt Nicole from Gold, 2012
 "Ready or Not", by Cascada from Evacuate the Dancefloor, 2009
 "Ready or Not", by Helen Reddy from We'll Sing in the Sunshine, 1978
 "Ready or Not", by Herbie Hancock from Feets, Don't Fail Me Now, 1979
 "Ready or Not", by Jackson Browne from For Everyman, 1973
 "Ready or Not", by the Lightning Seeds from Dizzy Heights, 1996
 "Ready or Not", by Michael Hedges from Live on the Double Planet, 1987
 "Ready or Not", by Shinee from Lucifer, 2010
 "Ready or Not", by Wax from American English, 1987

Other uses
 Ready or Not (novel), a 2005 novel by Meg Cabot
 Ready or Not (video game), a 2021 tactical first-person shooter

See also
 Hide-and-seek, a children's game initiated by a cry of "Ready or not, here I come!"
 "Ready or Not Here I Come (Can't Hide from Love)", a 1968 song by the Delfonics